Abdelkrim Bira is an Algerian football manager

References

Living people
Algerian football managers
Khaleej FC managers
AS Marsa managers
MC Alger managers
EGS Gafsa managers
USM Bel Abbès managers
NA Hussein Dey managers
CA Bordj Bou Arréridj managers
Algerian Ligue Professionnelle 1 managers
Saudi First Division League managers
Algerian expatriate football managers
Expatriate football managers in Saudi Arabia
Expatriate football managers in Tunisia
Algerian expatriate sportspeople in Saudi Arabia
Algerian expatriate sportspeople in Tunisia
21st-century Algerian people
1963 births